Haworthiopsis koelmaniorum (synonym Haworthia koelmaniorum) is a succulent plant in the subfamily Asphodeloideae, found in Mpumalanga, one of the Northern Provinces of South Africa.

References

koelmaniorum
Flora of the Northern Provinces